Forget-Me-Not is a maze game written by Australian developer Brandon Williamson under the name Nyarlu Labs and released on March 22, 2011 for Android and iOS. The game was removed from the App Store once 32-bit support was dropped, but later returned as part of the gaming subscription service GameClub.

Reception
Forget-Me-Not has a Metascore of 85% based on 13 critic reviews. In 2011, Metacritic also gave the game a ranking of the #71 Best IOS Game for the year.

References

2011 video games
Android (operating system) games
IOS games
Maze games
Video games developed in Australia
GameClub games